English rock band the Kinks staged their first concert tour of the United States in June and July1965. The sixteen concerts comprised the third stage of a world tour, following concerts in Australasia, Asia and the United Kingdom and before later stages in continental Europe. The US tour was plagued with issues between the band, their management, local promoters and the American music unions. Promoters and union officials filed complaints over the Kinks' unprofessional conduct, prompting the US musicians' union to withhold work permits from the band for the next four years, effectively banning them from US performance.

The programme was in the package-tour format typical of the 1960s, with one show per day, several support acts on the bill and the Kinks' set lasting around 40minutes. The concerts were often poorly attended due to a lack of advertising and promotion, leaving local promoters sometimes unable to pay the band the full amount. Disagreement over payment with a California promoter led to the band refusing to perform at the Cow Palace near San Francisco. The band were often at odds with American unions; during a week of promotional work in Los Angeles midway through the tour, lead guitarist Dave Davies's refusal to sign a contract with the US performers' union before a television appearance led to a physical fight between bandleader Ray Davies and a union official.

The relationship between Ray and the Kinks' personal manager Larry Page was marked by continual friction. Bothered by Ray's behaviour, Page departed to England in the tour's final week. On their return to London, the Kinks sought to dismiss Page for what they saw as an abandonment. The dismissal took three years to litigate in English courts. Unable to promote their music via subsequent tours or television appearances, the Kinks saw a decline in their US record sales. Cut off from the American music scene, Ray shifted his songwriting approach towards more overt English influences. Ray resolved the ban in early1969, and the Kinks staged a comeback tour later that year.

Background 

Larry Page, the Kinks' personal manager, announced the band's intention to tour the United States in April1965, with dates scheduled across three weeks in June and July. It was the band's first tour of the US. The shows formed the third leg of a world tour, following concerts in January and February in Australia, New Zealand, Singapore and Hong Kong and concerts in the United Kingdom in April and May.

After witnessing the enormous commercial success the Beatles experienced in the United States in 1964, Page hoped to break the Kinks into the American market before their contemporaries the Rolling Stones. Like the Beatles and the Rolling Stones, the Kinks were part of the British Invasion, a cultural phenomenon where British pop acts experienced sudden popularity in the US. The Kinks' first two singles in the country – "You Really Got Me" and "All Day and All of the Night", issued in September and December1964, respectively – had each reached the top ten of the Billboard Hot 100 chart, while their first US album was moderately successful, reaching number 29 in the magazine's Top LPs chart in March1965. The band and their management viewed a US tour as the next pivotal step in their career, something which would provide them a major opportunity to establish an international audience.

In mid-February1965, while returning to Britain from the first leg of their world tour, the Kinks visited the United States for the first time. When the band appeared on the musical variety programme Hullabaloo to promote their recent single "Tired of Waiting for You", they drew the ire of trade union officials for initially refusing to join the American Federation of Television and Radio Artists (AFTRA), the US performers' union, a requirement of their appearance. "Tired of Waiting for You" subsequently reached number six on the Billboard Hot 100, making it their third consecutive top ten single in the US. To capitalise on the nation-wide publicity of the band's television appearance, their US label Reprise Records rushed out a second album, Kinks-Size, which peaked at number 13 in June the same week the US tour commenced.

By early1965, the Kinks had developed a reputation for violence and aggression. The band's concerts were characterised by hysterical fans, whose attempts to swarm the group sometimes left them bruised, concussed and with torn clothing. A concert in Copenhagen, Denmark, on 9April devolved into a riot between police and around 2,000 concertgoers, resulting in ten arrests and smashed windows, mirrors and furniture. The band sometimes broke into physical altercations during rehearsals, recording sessions and concerts, with infighting common between brothers Ray and Dave Davies and between Dave and drummer Mick Avory. Tensions within the group were more elevated than usual following a violent inter-band dispute on 19May at a concert in Cardiff, Wales, where Avory struck Dave in the head with a hi-hat stand, resulting in his brief hospitalisation. The Kinks initially considered replacing Avory with another drummer, but the band's management forced them to downplay the incident to both avoid police charges and so they could fulfill their commitments, including the upcoming US tour. Page later recalled needing to keep the group separated on their tour bus, sitting in the middle while Dave and Ray were placed at opposite ends from Avory and bassist Pete Quaife. He further recalled that while Quaife was generally a calming influence among his bandmates, he remained hesitant to side with either the brothers or Avory.

Repertoire, tour personnel and equipment 

The US shows were in the package-tour format typical of the 1960s. The Kinks and contemporary English rock band the Moody Blues were set to be joint headliners, but when the Moody Blues were unable to enter the country after having been denied US visas, they were replaced with different American acts throughout the tour, including the Supremes, the Dave Clark Five and Sonny & Cher. Local groups and musicians performed as support acts, including Paul Peterson, Dick and Dee Dee, the Hollywood Argyles, the Rivieras and Dobie Gray, among others. Shows ran around three hours, and the Kinks' set generally lasted around 40 minutes. On Page's recommendation, they based their shows around their first hit single "You Really Got Me". To generate anticipation, they played the opening bars of the song at the start of each of concert before abruptly switching to a different number. They performed a complete version of the song midway through the set and repeated it during their encore. 

The Kinks wore matching red jackets, frilly shirts, black pants and Chelsea boots, all of which was custom-ordered from Bermans & Nathans, a major theatrical costumier in London. Page commissioned the outfits in April1964 as part of his early efforts to rework the band's image, providing them a distinctive look like the Beatles' collarless jackets of 1963. Collins and Wace regarded the Kinks' look as ironic, since the aristocratic gentlemanly outfits were subverted by the band's working class origins. While not historically accurate to the Victorian era, the look emphasised the band's Englishness, especially to an American audience who knew little about English culture.

Sound quality at the band's shows was poor, as the venues' often weak PA systems struggled to compete against the loud screams of fans. Drums were typically not miked, and Avory later recalled struggling to hear himself play at larger venues. A contemporary news article recounting a show at one of the smaller venues reported that the band's vocals were "lost in an array of electric guitars". Dave began the tour with his main guitar, a black Guild archtop electric with two Guild humbucking pickups and a Bigsby tailpiece, a custom-built instrument originally meant for Beatle George Harrison. An airline lost it as the band flew to Los Angeles, and as the band did not carry extra guitars, Dave went to a Los Angeles music store to find a replacement. Dave played the guitar at chest-height, placing his arm through the cut-out V shape at the guitar's base.

The Kinks were accompanied on tour by Page and road manager Sam Curtis, who was hired two months earlier before the band's recent UK tour. In the final week of the US tour, California businessman Don Zacharlini served as temporary tour manager in Page's place. The band's two original managers Grenville Collins and Robert Wace remained in the UK for the duration of the tour. The band were regularly visited by their publisher Edward Kassner, who took time to promote Ray's songwriting catalogue. The band's publicist Brian Somerville and booking agent Arthur Howes arrived in the US three weeks beforehand to perform advanced work, while the tour was booked by Ken Kendall Associates in New York City.

Tour

Final preparations 

After announcing the tour, Page made numerous changes to the itinerary. He announced different start dates in press releases before announcing a delay until , something necessitated by Dave's head injury in Cardiff. Early plans included different locations, including a Canadian show, probably for Vancouver on 11July. By 16June – the day before the Kinks departed for the tour – five of 16 finalised shows were cancelled, prompting the addition of five hastily arranged concerts.

The Kinks signed contracts for the tour on 16June at Denmark Productions, the London offices of Page and Kassner. Among the forms were applications to join the American Federation of Musicians (AFM), the US musicians' union. The union's main purpose was to regulate the movement and placement of professional musicians in America, and joining was a requirement for working in the country. Concerned that foreign workers would take away jobs from American citizens, the AFM in 1964 initially opposed allowing any British rock musicians to perform in the US. British groups often found the regulations of the AFM and AFTRA overly complicated, and some complained about the requirements to pay hundreds of dollars in fees for each visit. Ray initially expressed reservations about signing the necessary paperwork; after working a union job as a teenager, he had come to see trade unions as needlessly corrupt and militant. Page instead ascribed Ray's hesitance to his tendency towards prima donna-like behaviour.

While each of the Kinks had held romantic notions about the United States since they were young, Ray was apprehensive about visiting the country, having become more cynical of it after the assassination of US President John F. Kennedy in November1963. He worried in part how American police would respond to the Kinks' sometimes violent inter-band disputes, especially since only a month had passed since the incident in Cardiff. He was further disappointed by the poor financial returns of the band's February visit and was unhappy about leaving his wife at home with their first-born child, who was born weeks earlier in mid-May.

Arrival and issues with promoters 

The same day of their arrival, the band appeared on The Clay Cole Show to promote their latest single "Set Me Free", which entered the Hot 100 the week before at number 83. The tour's first show occurred the following day at the Academy of Music, a cinema in New York City. The appearance was beset by numerous issues; the band were disappointed by the old venue's facilities and the theatre's employees, who showed open contempt to those in the rock and roll business. The venue's marquee initially incorrectly advertised "The Kings", while dispute arose when the Kinks, the Supremes and the Dave Clark Five realised that promoter Sid Bernstein had promised each group that they would be topping the bill. Problems continued at the following day's performance in Philadelphia, where Page was arrested and briefly jailed for failing to pay a local tax as demanded by a union official.

The Kinks experienced regular fanaticism from their fans, many of whom were teenage girls. Upon their arrival in New York, the band were unable to enter their hotel for about two hours due to a large crowd, while on other nights fans clung to the side of their moving vehicle or smashed its windows with their fists. To keep the fans at bay, police escorted the band throughout the day and were posted at their hotel.

The Kinks' shows received little to no coverage in local newspapers, as journalists generally viewed the band as simple teenage entertainment. The band later described sometimes feeling resentment from Americans during the tour, especially as they proceeded into the American Midwest, where attitudes skewed more conservative. Ray further sensed disgust on the part of those in the American music business, whose unhappiness with disruption of their industry by British acts was compounded when the Kinks' appearances were drawing less money than originally expected. Having been hastily arranged only weeks earlier, the band's shows in Peoria and Springfield, Illinois, were poorly advertised and poorly run, contributing a growing feeling among the band that the tour was not meeting their original expectations. A show scheduled for 27June in Stockton, California, was cancelled a week beforehand, probably due to poor advance-ticket sales.

The Kinks and their management experienced regular issues with local promoters, who often looked for reasons to avoid paying the full amount required by contract. The band's 25June concert in Reno, Nevada, was poorly attended due to both a lack of advertising and because it conflicted with the opening day of the popular Annual Reno Rodeo. The show's promoter Betty Kaye offered the band half of the agreed payment upfront, promising them the rest after the next night's performance in Sacramento, California. In retaliation, Page threatened to sue Kaye, while the Kinks only performed for 20 minutes rather than the 40 minutes originally contracted. At the Sacramento show, Kaye was further offended when the Kinks played for 45 minutes but filled much of their set with a prolonged version of "You Really Got Me".

Promotional work and fight with union official 

From 27June to 2July, the Kinks had a week off from concerts, during which time they mostly did promotional work in Hollywood, California. The band lip-synched performances on the television programmes Shivaree, The Lloyd Thaxton Show, Shindig! and Dick Clark's variety show Where the Action Is. At the same time, Kassner promoted Ray's songwriting catalogue around Los Angeles. By the end of the week he had secured four agreements, including from Peggy Lee, who recorded "I Go to Sleep" as a single. The same week, as Cher finished sessions for her debut album at Gold Star Studios in Hollywood, Page convinced her to record "I Go to Sleep" as well.

Cher's recording inspired Page, who booked studio time for the Kinks at Gold Star on 30June. Having anticipated Page attempting to usurp his role, the band's producer Shel Talmy filed a legal notice before they left advising them to not record in the US without him. Despite the notice, the session proceeded anyways. The Kinks were enthusiastic at the prospect of recording in an American studio for the first time, especially after plans to  do so the day before at Warner Brothers Studios failed to materialise. During the session, the band recorded Ray's composition "Ring the Bells". Page hoped to issue the recording as their next single, but Talmy again served the band legal papers to prevent it, leaving the recording unissued.

At a separate evening session on 30June booked by the producers of Shindig!, a new backing track was recorded for "Long Tally Shorty" for the band's appearance on the programme. The only Kink on the track was Dave, who played rhythm guitar, while he was joined by musicians from Shingdig! house band the Shindogs. Among the musicians was lead guitarist James Burton, with whom the Kinks were especially excited to record, having known him for his guitar solos on many of Ricky Nelson's hits.

On 2July, the Kinks appeared at the Cinnamon Cinder club in North Hollywood for a daytime shoot of Where the Action Is. Before taping the segment, Dave refused to sign a contract presented to the band by AFTRA. The refusal prompted a union official to threaten to have the Kinks banned from ever playing in the US again. After a further exchange of words, a physical altercation occurred between the official and Ray, which ended when Ray punched him in the face. Ray later said the worker taunted the Kinks by calling them "communists", "limey bastards" and "fairies". He also recalled:

Departure of Larry Page 

Ray's fight with the union official on 2July marked a low point on the tour for him, a depression exacerbated by the absence of his wife Rasa. The following day, after the afternoon soundcheck at the Hollywood Bowl, Ray informed Page that he was not going to perform the evening's show. Page later recalled trying to convince Ray to perform: "I spent all day pleading, begging, grovelling – and this was after a very heavy tour... it was totally degrading for me." Ray demanded of Page that Rasa and Quaife's girlfriend Nicola be flown out to see them, and Page contacted Collins back in London to arrange the flight. Ray agreed to perform and the concert proceeded as normal in-front of a sell-out crowd of over 18,000 concertgoers. Rasa and Nicola arrived in Los Angeles after the show and joined the group for the remainder of the tour.

After weeks of being agitated by Ray's behaviour, Page lost his patience at the Hollywood Bowl. He abruptly departed back to London on the morning of 4July. In his place, he arranged for the band to be led by both Curtis and temporary tour manager Don Zacharlini, a local businessman who owned a chain of laundromats. Page advised Dave, Quaife and Avory of his intentions but did not tell Ray, who learned of Page's absence later that day as the band prepared to depart Los Angeles for San Francisco. Ray was incensed by what he saw as an abandonment of the band; after he expressed his feelings to his bandmates, the group decided that they would extricate Page from their business dealings upon their return to the UK.

The same day as Page's departure, the Kinks arrived at the Cow Palace near San Francisco for an afternoon show. Due to poor ticket sales – only 3,500 sold out of 14,000 – the promoter, Kaye, lost a significant amount of money. The band demanded to be paid upfront, but a lack of cash receipts meant that Kaye was only able to offer a cheque. In light of their earlier pay disputes with her while in Reno and Sacramento, the band refused to perform the San Francisco show. The band took the stage briefly to a mixture of screaming and booing, though accounts differ as to their conduct; musician Cyril Jordan, who was present backstage as part of a supporting act, later recalled the band making dismissive gestures, while an audience member instead remembered them waving to the crowd before leaving.

The final week of the tour proceeded generally without incident. The band arrived in Hawaii on 5July and held two concerts in Honolulu the following day. Ray had expected Hawaii to be overly commercialised, but he was charmed by the islands' quiet beaches; he later named it his best holiday ever, and Rasa described her and Ray's time there as like a second honeymoon. After an off-day spent in Waikiki, the band flew to Washington state and held three concerts, concluding the tour in Seattle on 10July. Ray and Dave arrived home in London on 11July while Quaife and Avory remained behind for ten days, sightseeing southern California with Zacharlini. Subsequent legs of the world tour followed in the Nordics in September and West Germany, Switzerland and France in October.

Aftermath

American performance ban 

Following the issues between the Kinks and promoter Betty Kaye in Reno, Sacramento and San Francisco, she filed a formal complaint with Local 6, the San Francisco branch of the AFM. Union officials in Los Angeles and likely San Francisco filed additional complaints. In response, the AFM withheld future work permits from the Kinks, in effect banning the band from future US performance.

The AFM's stated reason for banning the Kinks was their "unprofessional conduct". The union did not express the block publicly, nor did they communicate to the band an explanation or possible duration, resulting in vague explanations of the situation from Ray, Dave and the band's management in interviews over ensuing decades. The band hoped to return to the US soon after, but four tours booked for between December1965 and December1966 were each cancelled a month beforehand after the band proved unable to obtain work visas. The ban persisted for the next four years. Ray negotiated with the AFM to lift it in April1969, which they did only after he and the band's management wrote apologies to Kaye. The band's return tour ran from October to December1969.

The American ban hampered the development of the Kinks' career. Unable to promote their music in the US via tours or television appearances, they saw a decline in their American record sales. The band experienced continued success in the UK, but only two of their singles entered the top 30 of the Billboard Hot 100 while the ban remained active. Anticipating further visa issues, the band declined an invitation to the Monterey International Pop Festival, a June1967 Californian music festival which elevated the American popularity of numerous acts. Ray later suggested that the ban gave the Kinks a level of "mystique"; while the band steadily lost American fans, they retained a cult following.

In later interviews, Ray regularly cited the ban as producing a pivot in his songwriting towards English-focused lyrics. The situation left the Kinks comparatively isolated from American influence and changes in its music scene, guiding the band away from their earlier blues-based riffing towards a distinctly English style. While American songwriters explored the emerging drug culture and the nascent genre of psychedelia, Ray focused on English musical influences like music hall. Ray later suggested that visiting America ended his envy of the country's music, leading him to abandon attempts to "Americanise" his accent while withdrawing into what he later termed "complete Englishness and quaintness".

Litigation to dismiss Page 

Page remained unaware of the Kinks' plans to oust him until , when Ray visited a Sonny & Cher recording session at which Page was present. Ray objected to the duo recording one of his compositions, "Set Me Free", and also expressed his wish for Page to terminate any involvement with the Kinks.

Efforts to split the Kinks from Page commenced in late1965, when Wace and Collins' firm Boscobel Productions filed litigation against Page and Kassner's firm Denmark Productions. Page claimed he continued to be owed 10 per cent of all of the band's earnings since 1965, while Boscobel argued that Page's return to England on  constituted a breach of contract. Justice John Widgery concluded that the Kinks were entitled to dismiss Page because of his conduct, ruling for the High Court in June1967 that the two parties were legally terminated effective . The Court of Appeal upheld Widgery's ruling in June1968, though one of the three judges hearing the appeal, Justice Cyril Salmon, disagreed that Page's leaving justified the termination of the contract.

Set list
No complete set lists from the US tour are known to band biographers. Below are examples from the second and fifth legs of the world tour, roughly a month before and two months after the US tour, respectively:

30 April 1965, Adelphi Cinema, Slough, UK
"You Really Got Me"
"Beautiful Delilah"
"It's Alright"
"Tired of Waiting for You"
"Ev'rybody's Gonna Be Happy"
"It's All Over"
"All Day and All of the Night"
"Hide and Seek"

1 October 1965, Hit House, Munich, West Germany
"You Really Got Me"
"Beautiful Delilah"
"Tired of Waiting for You"
"Got Love If You Want It"
"Come On Now"
"All Day and All of the Night"

Tour dates 
According to band researcher Doug Hinman:

Note
The above table includes neither those shows which were cancelled before the tour began nor those which were not finalised.

Notes

References

Citations

Sources

Books

Liner notes

Newspaper, magazine and journal articles 
 
 
 
 
 
 
 
 
 
 

1965 concert tours
1965 in American music
Concert tours of the United States
June 1965 events in the United States
July 1965 events in the United States